Vrängö  is a village in Karlskrona Municipality, Blekinge County, southeastern Sweden. According to the 2005 census it had a population of 175 people. It is situated close to the mouth of the Nättrabyån river on its east bank.

References

Populated places in Karlskrona Municipality